Patrick or Paddy Kelly may refer to:

Politicians
 Patrick Kelly (Irish politician) (1875–1934), Irish soldier, farmer and politician, Teachta Dála (TD) for Clare 1927–1932
 Patrick Kelly (Canadian politician) (1846–1916), Prince Edward Island, Canada politician
 Patrick H. Kelly (1890–1965), American politician in Wisconsin

Musicians
 Michael Patrick Kelly (born 1977), known as Paddy, member of the Kelly Family of musicians
 Patrick Kelly (fiddler) (1903–1975), Irish musician

Religious figures
 Patrick Kelly (archbishop of Liverpool) (born 1938), British Roman Catholic prelate, previously bishop of Salford
 Patrick Kelly (bishop of Benin City) (1894–1991), Irish Roman Catholic prelate
 Patrick Kelly (bishop of Waterford and Lismore) (1779–1829), Irish Roman Catholic prelate, previously bishop of Richmond, United States

Sportspeople

Gaelic games
 Paddy Kelly (Cork footballer) (born 1985), Irish sportsperson
 Patrick Kelly (Galway Gaelic footballer), Irish sportsperson
 Paddy Kelly (Kerry footballer), Irish sportsperson
 Patrick Kelly (Limerick Gaelic footballer), won an All-Ireland Senior Football Championship in 1887
 Paddy Kelly (hurler) (born 1955), Irish hurler
 Patrick Kelly (Clare hurler) (born 1986), Irish sportsperson
 Paddy Kelly (Laois hurler), played in the 1949 All-Ireland Senior Hurling Championship Final

Others
 Paddy Kelly (Australian footballer) (1896–1970), Australian rules footballer
 Patrick Kelly (cricketer) (1929–2002), English cricketer
 Patrick Kelly (association footballer) (1918–1985), Barnsley and Northern Irish international footballer
 Paddy Kelly (footballer, born 1978), Scottish association footballer
 Patrick J. Kelly (horseman)
 Patrick J. Kelly (ice hockey) (born 1935), Canadian ice hockey player
 Paddy Kelly (rugby union) (born 1995), Scottish rugby union player

Others
 Patrick Kelly (metrologist) (1756–1842), British, best known for his Oriental Metrology
 Patrick Kelly (Civil War) (c. 1822–1864), Union Officer, U.S. Civil War
 Patrick Kelly (fashion designer) (1954–1990), fashion designer
 Patrick J. Kelly (surgeon) (fl. 2000s), American neurosurgeon
 Patrick Kelly (Irish soldier) (1948–1983), Irish soldier killed by the Provisional IRA
 Patrick Joseph Kelly (1957–1987), East Tyrone Provisional IRA leader
 Patrick F. Kelly (1929–2007), U.S. federal judge
 Patrick Kelly (RCMP officer), former Royal Canadian Mounted Police undercover agent and convicted murderer
 Patrick E. Kelly, Supreme Knight of the Knights of Columbus
 Patrick Leo Kelly (1914–2007), writer and activist

See also
 Pat Kelly (disambiguation)
 Patrick H. Kelley (1867–1925), politician
 Patrick E. Kelley, competition shooter